Ivan Selin (born March 11, 1937) is an American businessman, and former Chairman of the Nuclear Regulatory Commission and Under Secretary of State for Management. Selin is a Fulbright Scholar and graduate of Yale University (PhD, Electrical Engineering, 1960) and University of Paris (Doctor of Science, Mathematics, 1962). He was born in New York City.

Early career
From 1960 to 1965, Selin was a research engineer at the RAND Corporation, working on national security issues and statistical communication theory. In 1965, Selin went to work for the Office of the Secretary of Defense, one of Robert S. McNamara's Whiz Kids. From 1965 to 1970, Selin worked for McNamara, becoming Acting Assistant Secretary of Defense for Systems Analysis by the end of that period. He received the Department of Defense Distinguished Civilian Service Medal in 1970.

In 1970, Selin and several DOD colleagues co-founded American Management Systems, a technology and management consulting firm. Selin served as Chief Executive Officer from the company's founding to the late 1980s.

Selin served as chairman of the Military Economic Advisory Panel to the Director of Central Intelligence (1978–1989); member (1979–1989) and chairman (1988–1989) of the Board of Governors of the United Nations Association-USA; member of the Advisory Board on the USSR and Eastern Europe at the National Academy of Sciences (1986–88); and member of the Council on Foreign Relations (1979–present).

Later public service
Selin was Under Secretary of State for Management from May 23, 1989 to June 30, 1991. He received the Secretary of State's Distinguished Service Award in 1991.

On July 1, 1991, Selin became Chairman of the Nuclear Regulatory Commission, serving in that capacity until he resigned on June 30, 1995. Selin was sworn in by outgoing NRC Chairman Kenneth Monroe Carr and also had a ceremonial swearing-in ceremony at which Vice President Dan Quayle presided and Supreme Court Justice Sandra Day O'Connor administered the oath. Selin was Founding Chairman of the Board of the Smithsonian Institution's National Museum of American History.

For his government service, he received the Pentagon’s Distinguished Civilian Service medal in 1970.

References

External links

Living people
Nuclear Regulatory Commission officials
Yale School of Engineering & Applied Science alumni
University of Paris alumni
1937 births
United States Under Secretaries of State